Manuel “Manny” Catano is a retired American soccer midfielder who played professionally in the USISL.  He is a firefighter and coaches girls soccer.

Career
Catano graduated from Blue Springs High School in Blue Springs, Missouri where he was an All State high school soccer player.  In 1991, he played soccer at the University of Missouri–Kansas City.  That season, he led the Kangaroos in goals and points.  He then transferred to Park College where he finished his collegiate career.  In 1995, he played for the Des Moines Menace in the USISL.  In February 1996, the Columbus Crew selected Catano in the sixteenth round (151st overall) of the 1996 MLS Inaugural Player Draft.  On March 26, 1996, the Crew waived him and he moved to the Hawaii Tsunami for the 1996 season.  On August 16, 1997, Catano signed with the Tallahassee Scorpions of the Eastern Indoor Soccer League.  That winter, he spent time with the Kansas City Attack of the National Professional Soccer League.  He was back with the Scorpions in 1998.

References

Living people
American soccer coaches
American soccer players
Des Moines Menace players
Hawaii Tsunami players
Eastern Indoor Soccer League players
USISL players
Association football midfielders
Year of birth missing (living people)
Kansas City Roos men's soccer players